Danao, officially the City of Danao, is a 3rd class component city in the province of Cebu, Philippines. According to the 2020 census, it has a population of 156,321 people.

Danao is within the Metro Cebu area.

Geography
It is bordered on the north by Carmen, on the west by Asturias, on the south by Compostela and to the east by the Camotes Sea.

Barangays
Danao City comprises 42 barangays:

Climate

Demographics

Economy

Mining

Railways 
The Cebu railway ran from Danao south to Argao. During World War II, the bridges, tracks and Central Station were bombed so extensively that the railway never recovered, and it closed in 1942. After that, whatever was left after the war was dug up to become the Cebu North Road.

Now a new light railway is to be built in Cebu.

Sugar

The old system of milling sugar cane used to produce sugar, called "intosan". Although the railway was originally to move coal, it was soon used too to move sugar cane to the docks.

Gun industry
Danao City was well known for its gun industry. The industry started around 1905–06. When World War II came, the Danao gunsmiths went underground, joined the guerrilla movement or were inducted into the United States Army Forces in the Far East. Their main task was to re-chamber the Japanese Arisaka rifles to fit the US .30 caliber round or to keep the original Japanese rifle in good service.

The industry went on, still underground. In the 1960s, the term paltik was given to the homemade (and illegal) guns. In the early 1990s the industry was legalized by the government, with the creation of two organizations of local gunsmiths. The organization now left with proper permit is Workers League of Danao Multi-purpose Cooperative (World MPC), in Dungguan, Danao City.

World MPC was incorporated in October 1994 with twenty-five initial members. In November 1996 it was given license to manufacture handguns from caliber .22 to .45 by the Philippine National Police (PNP). The organization had been a potent group in working for the legalization of gun-making industry in the country with the aim to upgrade the technology and skills of gun makers, to provide job security and additional revenue for the government. The gun-making industry in Danao was pioneered using brass or copper as materials. The Chairman of World MPC was in charge of the compliance of the requirements of the Firearms Explosives Security Service Agency and Guards Supervisory Section (FESSAGES) until his death in 2010 after which World MPC itself was then shutdown for non-compliance of FESSAGES policies.

Holiday industry

Tourism in the area is still in its infancy. All along the eastern seaboard of Cebu there are family-owned resorts.

In 2017, Danao hosted the Xterra Off-road Triathlon. This was held at the Coco Palms resort.

Mitsumi

Mitsumi is one of the largest employers in northern Cebu.

Metro Cebu Expressway
Work for the ₱50 billion,  Metro Cebu Expressway, started in 2018. It will connect Naga City in the south to Danao City in the north.

Gallery

Notes

References

Sources

External links

Cities in Cebu
Cities in Metro Cebu
Populated places established in 1773
Component cities in the Philippines